Aliya-Jasmine "AJ" Sovani (born November 18, 1981) is a television broadcaster and producer, initially known for her work on MTV. She is currently working as a host for NBC.

Career 
Before working at MTV, Sovani was a producer at MuchMusic, and has worked in front of and behind the camera at BPM:TV, Star!, and FashionTelevision as well as a freelance writer and professional speaker. She also worked as the Whistler Reporter for CTV's Olympic Morning show during the 2010 Winter Olympic Games in Vancouver, British Columbia, Canada.

Over the past decade, Sovani has been a reporter at the Vancouver Winter Olympics for CTV's Olympic Morning Show, was on the ground in Haiti after the devastating earthquake alongside actor Jared Leto for the Discovery channel, was an NHL playoffs reporter for the Stanley Cup countdown, and hosted the ESPYS red carpet with Cabbie on TSN. She was on one seven on-air personalities that launched MTV Canada in 2006 and appeared regularly on the flagship show MTV Live.  She soon expanded her role and was involved with several other programs on the network.  She is best known for having produced & hosted her on Sports/PopCulture series on MTV called "PLAY with AJ". She also anchored MTV News, was a regularly contributor to MTV Movie Night and hosted the talk show 1 Girl 5 Gays (a.k.a. "1g5g") on MTV (Canada) and Logo (TV channel) in the USA.

Sovani was the 2012 face of the NFL's women's apparel campaign launched by Vogue and photographed by French photographer Patrick Demarchelier in New York City's meat packing district. She recently collaborated with the CFL to design a women's sweatshirt for the 2014 Grey Cup.

Personal life 
Sovani was born on November 18, 1981, in Ottawa; she is of Indian descent.

She received international attention from various media outlets including The View, The Huffington Post, and Good Morning America for a breast cancer awareness video she wrote, and directed that went viral called "Save the Boobs".

In 2010, she was selected as one of HELLO! Magazine's 50 most beautiful Canadians and the National Post newspaper's "Worthy-30 to watch" lists.

She has her Social Media & Digital Marketing certificate from Harvard University, and her BA degree in Broadcast Communications from the University of Ottawa.

References

External links
Aliya Jasmine Sovani
Cast biographies of 1 Girl 5 Gays on mtv.ca
Aliya's Facebook site

Living people
Canadian television producers
Canadian women television producers
People from Ottawa
Canadian people of Iranian descent
Canadian people of Indian descent
1982 births